Termitomyces bulborhizus is a species of agaric fungus in the family Lyophyllaceae. Found in Sichuan, China, it was formally described in 2004. The specific epithet, derived from the Greek words bulbus ("bulbous") and rhizus ("root"), refers to the bulbous base of the stipe.

References

Lyophyllaceae
Fungi described in 2004
Fungi of China